The 12 String Guitar of Glen Campbell contains instrumental-only songs, the majority of which were taken from The Swinging 12 String originally released by The In Group featuring Glen Campbell on twelve string guitar and Leon Russell on harpsichord.

Track listing
Side 1:

 "Cottonfields" (Folkways BMI) - 2:30
 "The Man With The Golden Gun" (Bond) - 2:25
 "Walk Right In" (Cannon/Woods) - 2:17
 "Gospel Harp" (Bond) - 2:07
 "Virginia"

Side 2:

 "Greenback Dollar" (Axton/Ramsey) - 2:00
 "If I Had A Hammer" (Hays/Seeger) - 2:50
 "Cherry Beat" (Bond) - 2:35
 "Greenfields" (Gilkyson/Dehr/Miller) - 2:20
 "Tender and Fair"

1966 compilation albums
Glen Campbell compilation albums
Pickwick Records compilation albums
Instrumental compilation albums